Rewa district is a district of the Madhya Pradesh state in central India. The city of Rewa is the district headquarter. Rewa is sometimes called - 'Land of White Tigers' as the first White Tiger was discovered here in 1951 by Maharaja of the province, Martand Singh  in the nearby jungle of Govindgarh. Rewa was the capital city of once a state - Vindhya Pradesh.

Geography
Rewa lies between 24° 18’ and 25° 12’ north latitudes and 81° 2’ and 82° 18’. The district is bounded on the north by Uttar Pradesh, on the east and southeast by Sidhi, on the south by Shahdol, and on the west by Satna. Rewa district is part of Rewa Division and has an area of 6,240 km2.

The Huzur, Sirmour and Mauganj tehsils lie between the Kaimur Range in the south, and the Binjh pahar in the north, and form what is known as the Rewa plateau or uprihar. To the north lies the Teonther tehsil which is quite different in its physical and other features from the plateau tehsils. The Rewa plateau decreases in height from south to north. In the south, the Kaimur Range rises to more than 450 meters above sea level, whereas the alluvial plain of Teonthor is just 100 meters above sea level. In the eastern side of Rewa some small cities and towns are there like Manikwar , Mauganj , Mangawan , Hanumana.

The district has a varied terrain that includes alluvial plains, hills, ravines, scarp, rivers, and water-falls. The rain-water of the district flows out along two tributary rivers of the Ganges, the Tons or Tamas and the Son. The Bichiya River flows through the heart of Rewa city.

The Tamsa or Tons and its tributaries form waterfalls as they descend from the Rewa Plateau, including: the Chachai Falls (127m) on the Bihar River, a tributary of the Tamsa, the Keoti Falls (98m) on the Mahana River, a tributary of the Tamsa, the Odda Falls (145m) on the Odda River, a tributary of the Belah River, which is itself a tributary of the Tamsa, Bahuti fall on Chataniha river beside Misirgawan village, and the Purwa Falls (70m) on the Tamsa or Tons.

Demographics 

According to the 2011 census, Rewa District has a population of 2,365,106, roughly equal to the nation of Latvia or the US state of New Mexico. This gives it a ranking of 191st in India (out of a total of 640). Its population growth rate over the decade 2001-2011 was 19.79%. Rewa has a sex ratio of 930 females for every 1000 males, and a literacy rate of 73.42%. 16.73% of the population lives in urban areas. Scheduled Castes and Scheduled Tribes make up 16.22% and 13.19% of the population respectively.

Hinduism is majority religion in Rewa district with 95.93% followers. Islam is second most popular religion of Rewa with approximately 3.61% following it. Christianity is followed by 0.08%, Jainism by 0.03%, Sikhism by 0.04% and Buddhism by 0.04%. Around 0.01% stated 'Other Religion', approximately 0.26% stated 'No Particular Religion'.

At the time of the 2011 census, 65.01% of the population spoke Bagheli and 34.34% Hindi as their first language.

Governance 
Rewa district, itself Rewa Lok Sabha constituency is divided into following 8 Vidhan Sabha (Legislative assembly) Constituencies:

 Deotalab
 Gurh
 Mangawan
 Mauganj
 Rewa
 Semariya
 Sirmaur
 Teonthar

Climate 
Rewa has a humid subtropical climate, with cold, misty winters, hot summer and a humid monsoon season. Summers start in late March and go on till mid-June, the average temperature being around 30 °C (86 °F), with the peak of summer in May, when the highs regularly exceed 45 °C (104 °F). The monsoon starts in late June and ends in late September. These months see about 40 inches (1025 mm) of precipitation. The average temperature is around 25 °C (77 °F) and the humidity is quite high. Temperatures rise again up to late October when winter starts, which lasts up to early March. Winters in Rewa are cold and misty with average temperatures around 15 °C (58 °F) and little rain. The winter peaks in January when temperatures may drop close to freezing on some nights. The total annual rainfall is about 1128 mm (44 inches).

Divisions
Rewa district of Madhya Pradesh has 11 Tehsils

 Gurh
 Hanumana
 Huzur
 Jawa
 Mangawan
 Mauganj
 Nai Garhi
 Raipur - Karchuliyan
 Semaria
 Sirmaur
 Teonthar

Tourism

Historical Places
 Rewa Fort
It is the main tourist attractions in Rewa.Behind it there are two rivers which provide the scenic beauty to the fort. The main gate of the fort is a good example of Indian architecture.It also provides accommodations to tourists. It have also houses a restaurant and a museum. The main sites to visit here are the canon, royal silver throne, museum hall’s chandelier, arms gallery and the white tiger gallery.
 Govindgarh Palace and Lake
Govindgarh, the summer capital of Mahraja Rewa, is about 18 km from Rewa in Madhya Pradesh, India. The Rewa, with an area of about 13,000 m², was the largest princely state in the Bagelkhand Agency and the second largest in Central India Agency. The British political agent for Bagelkhand resided at Satna, on the East Indian railway. The Bagelkhand Agency was dissolved in 1933 and Rewa was placed under the authority of the Indore Residency.
 Stupa
This archaeological site has a great history to tell with the ancient Buddhist stupas that you will find here. Discovered in the year 1982, these stupas are said to be about two thousand years old and belonging to the Ashoka’s reign. You will find three large stupas carved out of clay bricks and several small stupas out of 46 different stones.

Deur Kothar also has five thousand years old rocky caves which are definitely very intriguing in their appearance. As an attempt to spread Buddhism in the Vindhyan region during the period of Ashoka, the remains of Lord Buddha were distributed to create these stupas. Deur Kothar is an archaeological site among the prestigious Rewa tourist places where followers of Buddhism have build stupas after this site was found.

Natural Wonders
 Purwa Falls
The Falls are 200 feet high (nearly 67 m) and present one heck of a robust view. The falls are intense and an enormous volume of water falls every second. The Falls are on River Toans, descending the cliff of Rewa Plateau. However, the Falls gain or lose their majesty with season and are best to visit when the rains are in full swing.
 Keoti Falls
For a pleasant time with family and friends in Rewa, visit the Keoti Waterfall. It is the 24th highest waterfalls in India and is a really popular tourist destination .The view from the falls during sunset and sunrise is something one shouldn’t miss during the trip. A great way to have some intimate time with loved ones. Keoti Waterfall is a place in Rewa that will blend you with the locals as it is usually crowded with people be it tourists or the localities.
 Bahuti Falls
Bahuti is the highest waterfall in Madhya Pradesh. It is on the river Sellar as it rushes down the edge of the Valley of Mauganj to join the Bihad River, which is a tributary of Tamsa or Tons River. It is near Chachai Falls. It has a height of 198 metres (650 ft).
 Chachai Falls
Chachai falls are more than 130 meters in height and are situated on River Bihad, near Rewa, Madhya Pradesh. These falls are the second highest waterfalls in Madhya Pradesh and is counted amongst one of the highest single-drop waterfalls in India. It was once praised by former Indian Prime Minister Sh. Jawahar Lal Nehru for its breathtaking charisma and beauty. However, that time is long gone as a river diversion has been constructed on this river, which splits all of the water of Bihad river in two halves, one for generation of Electricity at Toans Hydroelectric Power Plant and another half for irrigation in nearby villages, leaves absolutely no water for the waterfalls. The coarse of the river has been changed and since then, the waterfalls are dry, which flood once during the rainy season when excess water is discharged from the dam.

 White Tiger Safari & Zoo
The first of the white tigers to be captured was a cub, approximately two years old, who was captured by Maharajah Martand Singh of Rewa. The tiger lived in captivity at the Maharajah's summer palace for five years and, on its death, was stuffed and sent as a gift to King George V as a sign of India's loyalty to the crown. To this day, white tigers are still kept at the Maharajah's summer palace which is located at Govindgarh.

There is a White Tiger Safari in Mukundpur which first opened in April 3, 2016.

 Rani Talab

Solar Power Plant
Rewa Ultra Mega Solar is an operational ground mounted, grid-connected photovoltaic solar park spread over an area of 1,590 acres (6.4 km2) in the Gurh tehsil of Rewa district.

Economy
A limestone belt runs through the Rewa district and coal is found in the nearby districts of Shahdol, Umaria, Sidhi and Singrauli. Cement factories are located in nearby Naubasta, Bela (Satna district) and Bhagwar (Sidhi district). The Jaypee Group has built a township known as Jaypee Nagar in Rewa. Prism cement (previously Rasi Cement), operates near Rewa in Satna district.

In 2006, the Ministry of Panchayati Raj named Rewa one of the country's 250 most backward districts (out of a total of 640 districts in India). It is one of the 24 districts in Madhya Pradesh currently receiving funds from the Backward Regions Grant Fund Programme (BRGF).

The 750MW Rewa Ultra Mega Solar plant, one of the largest solar power projects in India was commissioned in July 2018.

Transport
Railways: Rewa is connected to Satna through a 50 km Rewa-Satna Rail Line. Satna falls on the Mumbai Howrah main line via Allahabad. For state capital Bhopal and National capital Delhi there is daily train service from Rewa. Rewa Jabalpur intercity is also a good train for commuting between these two cities within single day. 

Road: Main city lies where NH30 and NH39 interact with each other. It is connected with Jabalpur and Nagpur on one side and Prayagraj, Varanasi on the other side by four lane national highway. Sidhi and Shahdol districts are connected by two lane road. Daily bus service is available for major cities like Nagpur, Bhopal, Indore, Raipur etc. 

Air: Closest major Airport to Rewa is in Prayagraj which is 130 kilometers (80.7 miles) away and has flights to major destinations such as Delhi, Bangaluru, Mumbai,Pune, Kolkata etc. Other nearest airport is at Khajuraho. Rewa also has an air strip.

Notable people 

 Awadhesh Pratap Singh, Politician and Member of the Constituent Assembly
 Sriniwas Tiwari, former Speaker of Legislative assembly of Madhya Pradesh
 Avani Chaturvedi, India's first female fighter pilot
 Mohena Singh, Indian Television actress
 Kumud Mishra, Indian actor
 Ram Vilas Vedanti, Indian Politician, former MP and Member of Shri Ram Janmabhumi
 Govind Narayan Singh, former Chief Minister of Madhya Pradesh
 Rajendra Shukla, Politician and Member of the State Assembly
 Ishwar Pandey, Indian Cricketer
 Kuldeep Sen, Indian Cricketer
 Girish Gautam, Speaker of Legislative assembly of Madhya Pradesh

See also

References

External links

Government website on Rewa

 
Districts of Madhya Pradesh